Mekas is a surname. Notable people with the surname include:

 Adolfas Mekas (1925–2011), Lithuanian-born American filmmaker, writer, director, and editor
 Jonas Mekas (1922–2019), Lithuanian-born American filmmaker, writer, and curator

Lithuanian-language surnames

lt:Mekas